The 2nd constituency of Réunion is a French legislative constituency on the island of Réunion, represented by Karine Lebon as of 2022.

Deputies

Election results

2022

2020 by-election

2017

2012

Sources

 French Interior Ministry results website: 

2